Larry Nicholson is an American boxer.

Life and career 
Nicholson attended Chapel Hill High School and Northern Michigan University.

Nicholson competed at the 1993 World Amateur Boxing Championships, winning the silver medal in the lightweight event.

References

External links 

Living people
Place of birth missing (living people)
Year of birth missing (living people)
American male boxers
Lightweight boxers
AIBA World Boxing Championships medalists
Northern Michigan University alumni